The Democratic Unity Roundtable (MUD) was a catch-all electoral coalition of Venezuelan political parties formed in January 2008 to unify the opposition to President Hugo Chávez's United Socialist Party of Venezuela in the 2010 Venezuelan parliamentary election. A previous opposition umbrella group, the Coordinadora Democrática, had collapsed after the failure of the 2004 Venezuelan recall referendum.

The coalition was made of primarily centrist and centre-left parties. The main components were Democratic Action and Copei, the two parties who dominated Venezuelan politics from 1959 to 1999. Since the 2013 Venezuelan presidential election, Justice First became the largest opposition party, and Henrique Capriles Radonski became the leader of the opposition.

In the 2015 parliamentary election, the coalition became the largest group in the National Assembly with 112 out of 167 (a supermajority), ending sixteen years of PSUV rule of the country's unicameral parliament. In the 2017 Venezuelan Constituent Assembly election, the MUD boycotted the election, and as the National Assembly itself lost most of its power, PSUV retook its parliamentary majority.

In July 2018, Democratic Action, one of the largest and most distinguished parties of the MUD, said they will leave the coalition.

Overview
The MUD was formally launched on 23 January 2008 and restructured on 8 June 2009. In June 2009 MUD included 11 political parties, and was led by Luis Ignacio Planas, President of Copei. By April 2010 the MUD included around 50 political parties, of which 16 were national in scope (the rest regional), and had support from some other social organisations and opinion groups. The main parties included in MUD are Democratic Action and Copei, the two parties who dominated Venezuelan politics from 1959 to 1999; the dissenting left-wing parties Movement for Socialism, Radical Cause and Red Flag Party; and more recently established parties Project Venezuela, A New Era, Justice First and For Social Democracy ("PODEMOS").

The MUD was supported by the Movimiento 2D opposition movement led by El Nacional editor and proprietor Miguel Henrique Otero.

Ramón Guillermo Aveledo served as the MUD's Executive Secretary from March 2009 to July 2014.

The journalist Jesús "Chúo" Torrealba became the coalition's current Executive Secretary in September 2014.

The MUD declared common ideological points between its members in its National Unity Agreement. They support autonomy of State institutions. Furthermore, its members represent and foster ideological pluralism within the democratic Left. MUD supports freedom of work, property, press, and free education. It advocates decentralize power and federalization. It also promotes public security, defense of private property and economic freedoms, quality education, job creation, and job creation and fair distribution of income from national oil reserves. The MUD wants a foreign policy based on solidarity, especially Venezuela's neighbors. It also wants various policies to make Venezuela more democratic, especially in regards to reducing the institutional influence of the military and reforming electoral laws.

In early September 2012, David De Lima, a former governor of Anzoategui, published a document he said showed secret MUD plans to implement much more neoliberal policy, if elected, than their public statements showed. De Lima said the document was a form of policy pact between some of the candidates in the MUD primary, including Capriles. On 6 September 2012, opposition legislator William Ojeda denounced these plans and the "neoliberal obsessions" of his colleagues in the MUD; he was suspended by his A New Era party the following day. One small coalition party claimed De Lima had offered them money to withdraw from the MUD; De Lima denied the claim.

2010 legislative elections

In April 2010 the MUD held primaries in 15 electoral districts, with 361,000 voters participating, and selecting 22 candidates (the remaining 143 candidates were chosen "by consensus"). The candidates chosen included María Corina Machado (of Súmate) and Iván Simonovis, one of nine police officials allegedly serving time for participating in the alleged 2002 Venezuelan coup d'état attempt. Several others of the nine, regarded by the MUD as political prisoners, were also nominated, in districts with a real chance of opposition success; winning would require their release because of parliamentary immunity. Manuel Rosales, the opposition's candidate in the 2006 Venezuelan presidential election and now in exile in Peru due to corruption charges (which Rosales denies), was also nominated.

In the September 2010 election for the National Assembly of Venezuela the MUD won around 47% of the vote nationally; however, it only gained 64 seats (out of 165) due to changes in population-vote distribution introduced by the incumbent national assembly that had a government party supermajority. In the same elections, the United Socialist Party of Venezuela won 48% of the vote and 98 seats, while the Patria Para Todos (PPT) party got only 2 seats. Notable new deputies included María Corina Machado and Enrique Mendoza.

2012 presidential election

The MUD held an open primary election on 12 February 2012. Henrique Capriles Radonski won the opposition primaries with 1,900,528 (64.2%) votes of the 3,059,024 votes cast (votes abroad not included).  The other candidates on the 12 February 2012 primary ballot were:
 Pablo Pérez Álvarez: governor of Zulia state, representing the A New Era party; received 30.3% of the vote.
 María Corina Machado: former Súmate president and member of the National Assembly of Venezuela representing the Miranda state since 2011; received 3.7% of the vote.
 Diego Arria: former Venezuelan representative to the United Nations (1990–91) and former governor of the defunct Federal District (1974–78); received 1.3% of the vote.
 Pablo Medina: politician and former trade union leader, supported by the trade unions; received 0.5% of the vote.

2015 legislative elections 

In December 2015, MUD won 112 of the 167 seats in the National Assembly, a two-thirds supermajority.

Member parties

Former member parties

The Christian democratic Copei party was not a member of the coalition in the 2015 parliamentary election, despite having been a founding member of the MUD.

The Communist Red Flag Party was a member of the coalition and supported the opposition candidate Henrique Capriles Radonski in the 2012 presidential election, but due to different objectives, the Red Flag Party stepped out of the MUD.

In August 2017, Come Venezuela left the Democratic Unity Roundtable over a disagreement regarding electoral participation.

In July 2018, the social democratic Democratic Action left the Democratic Unity Roundtable.

Electoral results

Presidential elections

Parliamentary elections

See also
 Great Patriotic Pole — political coalition lead by President Nicolas Maduro

Notes

References

External links
Unidad Venezuela

2008 establishments in Venezuela
2021 disestablishments in Venezuela
Crisis in Venezuela
Defunct political party alliances in Venezuela
Organizations disestablished in 2021
Organizations established in 2008
Political opposition organizations
Politics of Venezuela
Opposition to Hugo Chávez